De Hoop (English The Hope) is a name used for mills in Belgium and the Netherlands.

Windmills
De Hoop, Abbenbroek, a windmill in South Holland, Netherlands
De Hoop, Almelo, a windmill in Overijssel, Netherlands
De Hoop, Arnhem (1846), a windmill in Gelderland, Netherlands
De Hoop, Arnhem (1849), a windmill in Gelderland, Netherlands
De Hoop, Bavel, a windmill in North Brabant, Netherlands
De Hoop, Bunschoten, a windmill in Utrecht, Netherlands
De Hoop, Culemborg, a windmill in Gelderland, Netherlands
De Hoop, Den Hout, a windmill in North Brabant, Netherlands
De Hoop, Den Oever, a windmill in North Holland, Netherlands
De Hoop, Dokkum, a windmill in Friesland, Netherlands
De Hoop, Elden, a windmill in Gelderland, Netherlands
De Hoop, Elen, a windmill in Limburg, Belgium
De Hoop, Elspeet, a windmill in Gelderland, Netherlands
De Hoop, Garderen, a windmill in Gelderland, Netherlands
De Hoop, Garsthuizen, a windmill in Groningen, Netherlands
De Hoop, Giesbeek, a windmill in Gelderland, Netherlands
De Hoop, Gorinchem, a windmill in South Holland, Netherlands
De Hoop, Harderwijk, a windmill in Gelderland, Netherlands
De Hoop, Haren, a windmill in Groningen, Netherlands
De Hoop, Hellendoorn, a windmill in Overijssel, Netherlands
De Hoop, Hellevoetsluis, a windmill in South Holland, Netherlands
De Hoop, Holwerd, a windmill in Friesland, Netherlands
De Hoop, Horn, a windmill in Limburg, Netherlands
De Hoop, Klarenbeek, a windmill in Gelderland, Netherlands
De Hoop, Kropswolde, a windmill in Groningen, Netherlands
De Hoop, Loenen aan de Vecht, a windmill in Utrecht, Netherlands
De Hoop, Lunteren, a windmill in Gelderland, Netherlands
De Hoop, Maasdam, a windmill in South Holland, Netherlands
De Hoop, Maassluis, a windmill in South Holland, Netherlands
De Hoop, Markelo, a windmill in Overijssel, Netherlands
De Hoop, Maurik, a windmill in Gelderland, Netherlands
De Hoop, Middelburg, a windmill in Zeeland, Netherlands
De Hoop, Middelstum, a windmill in Groningen, Netherlands
De Hoop, Nijkerk-Appel, a windmill in Gelderland, Netherlands
De Hoop, Norg, a windmill in Drenthe, Netherlands
De Hoop, Oldebroek, a windmill in Gelderland, Netherlands
De Hoop, Oud-Alblas, a windmill in South Holland, Netherlands
De Hoop, Ouddorp, a windmill in South Holland, Netherlands
De Hoop, Oude Niedorp, a windmill in North Holland, Netherlands
De Hoop, Oud-Zevenaar, a windmill in Gelderland, Netherlands
De Hoop, Rha, a windmill in Gelderland, Netherlands
De Hoop, Rijswijk, a windmill in Gelderland, Netherlands
De Hoop, Roodkerk, a windmill in Friesland, Netherlands
De Hoop, Roosendaal, a windmill in North Brabant, Netherlands
De Hoop, Rozenburg, a windmill in South Holland, Netherlands
De Hoop, Sint Philipsland, a windmill in Zeeland, Netherlands
De Hoop, Sleen, a windmill in Drenthe, Netherlands
De Hoop, Stiens, a windmill in Friesland, Netherlands
De Hoop, Sprundel, a windmill in North Brabant, Netherlands
De Hoop, Sumar, a windmill in Friesland, Netherlands
De Hoop, Swartbroek, a windmill in Limburg, Netherlands
De Hoop, Tholen, a windmill in Zeeland, Netherlands
De Hoop, Veen, a windmill in North Brabant, Netherlands
De Hoop, Vorden, a windmill in Gelderland, Netherlands
De Hoop, Wachtum, a windmill in Drenthe, Netherlands
De Hoop, Wemeldinge, a windmill in Zeeland, Netherlands
De Hoop, Wervershoef, a windmill in North Holland, Netherlands
De Hoop, Wieringerwaard, a windmill in North Holland, Netherlands
De Hoop, Wolphaartsdijk, a windmill in Zeeland, Netherlands
De Hoop, Zierikzee, a windmill in Zeeland, Netherlands
De Hoop, Zoetermeer, a windmill in South Holland, Netherlands
De Hoop, Zuilichem, a windmill in Gelderland, Netherlands
De Hoop & Verwachting, Borssele, a windmill in Zeeland, Netherlands
De Goede Hoop, Menen, a windmill in West Flanders, Belgium
De Goede Hoop, Mijnsheerenland, a windmill in South Holland, Netherlands
Hoop Doet Leven, Made, a windmill in North Brabant, Netherlands
Hoop Doet Leven, Voorhout, a windmill in South Holland, Netherlands
Hoop op Beter, Veendam, a windmill in Groningen, Netherlands which was moved to Wachtum
Hoop van Zegen, Zuidwolde, a windmill in Drenthe, Netherlands
Op Hoop van Beter, Ingen, a windmill in Gelderland, Netherlands

Other uses
De Hoop, Guyana, a municipality in Guyana
De Hoop Hindu Temple
De Hoop Dam in Western Cape, South Africa
De Hoop Dam (Limpopo) in Limpopo, South Africa
De Hoop Nature Reserve in South Africa
De Hoop, Western Cape in South Africa

See also
 Hope (disambiguation)